Paracymus is a genus of hydrophilid beetles with 81 species worldwide.<ref>{{cite journal |first=David P. |last=Wooldridge |title=The Paracymus of the Ethiopian faunal region (Coleoptera: Hydrophilidae) |journal=Journal of the Kansas Entomological Society |volume=50 |issue=3 |year=1977 |pages=375–388}}</ref>

Species
 Paracymus acutipenis Wooldridge, 1971
 Paracymus amplus Wooldridge, 1977
 Paracymus armatus (Sharp, 1882)
 Paracymus blandus Wooldridge, 1976
 Paracymus communis Wooldridge, 1966
 Paracymus confluens Wooldridge, 1966
 Paracymus confusus Wooldridge, 1966
 Paracymus corrinae Wooldridge, 1969
 Paracymus delatus Wooldridge, 1971
 Paracymus degener (Horn, 1890)
 Paracymus desolatus Wooldridge, 19736
 Paracymus despectus (LeConte, 1863)
 Paracymus diligens Wooldridge, 1977
 Paracymus dispersus Wooldridge, 1966
 Paracymus elegans (Fall, 1901)
 Paracymus ellipsis (Fall, 1910)
 Paracymus exiguus Wooldridge, 1977
 Paracymus generosus Wooldridge, 1977
 Paracymus giganticus Wooldridge, 1973
 Paracymus incomptus Wooldridge, 1977
 Paracymus indigens Wooldridge, 1969
 Paracymus insularis Wooldridge, 1973
 Paracymus leechi Wooldridge, 1969
 Paracymus limbatus Wooldridge, 1973
 Paracymus lodingi (Fall, 1910)
 Paracymus metallescens Fauvel, 1883
 Paracymus mexicanus Wooldridge, 1969
 Paracymus mimicus Wooldridge, 1977
 Paracymus monticola Wooldridge, 1977
 Paracymus nanus (Fall, 1910)
 Paracymus ornatus Wooldridge, 1977
 Paracymus pacatus Wooldridge, 1976
 Paracymus petulans Wooldridge, 1977
 Paracymus placidus Wooldridge, 1973
 Paracymus propius Wooldridge, 1977
 Paracymus pusillus Wooldridge, 1977
 Paracymus reductus (Fall, 1910)
 Paracymus regularis Wooldridge, 1969
 Paracymus restrictus Wooldridge, 1966
 Paracymus robustus Wooldridge, 1973
 Paracymus seclusus Wooldridge, 1978
 Paracymus scutellaris (Rosenhauer, 1856)
 Paracymus simulatus Wooldridge, 1976
 Paracymus spangleri Wooldridge, 1969
 Paracymus subcupreus (Say, 1825)
 Paracymus tarsalis Miler, 1963
 Paracymus vulgatus'' Wooldridge, 1977

References

Hydrophilidae genera
Hydrophilinae